Indigofera candicans, the white-leaved indigo, is a species of flowering plant in the family Fabaceae, native to the Cape Provinces of South Africa. The stems and the undersides of the leaves are white.

References

candicans
Endemic flora of South Africa
Flora of the Cape Provinces
Plants described in 1789